Seč is a village and municipality in Prievidza District in the Trenčín Region of western Slovakia.

History
In historical records the village was first mentioned in 1275.

Geography
The municipality lies at an altitude of 440 metres and covers an area of 7.652 km². It has a population of about 410 people.

External links
http://www.statistics.sk/mosmis/eng/run.html

Villages and municipalities in Prievidza District